Iwan "Iwcs" Roberts (born 1967) is a Welsh actor, lyricist, singer, novelist, script writer and film producer of Dal y Mellt.  He has worked on various films, including the BAFTA-winning productions Eldra and Y Lleill (The Others), and is well known for his portrayal of character Kevin Powell in the Welsh soap opera Pobl y Cwm.  He has also had a successful career as a singer-songwriter, both as part of the duo Iwcs a Doyle and as a solo artist.

Early life
Iwan Roberts was raised in the village of Trawsfynydd, Gwynedd.  A creative talent and an avid performer from an early age, he gained his first stage experience while still a pupil at Ysgol Bro Hedd Wyn primary school.

Career

Beginnings: 1985–1996
After completing his secondary education at Ysgol y Moelwyn, Blaenau Ffestiniog, he enrolled on a course in engineering, with aspirations of becoming a blacksmith. At the same time, his love of performing led him to join the theatre group Theatr Bara Caws.  He appeared in various theatre productions with Theatr Bara Caws, Theatr Arad Goch and others, before making his television debut in the comedy series Rhew Poeth, which was shown on the Welsh-language channel S4C in 1986. He also made a brief appearance in the BBC Wales soap opera Pobol y Cwm, and the popular comedy series C'mon Midffild in the 1980s, before going on to act in other Welsh language series including, Minafon and Lleifior.  In 1994, he played the role of Dafydd in the period drama Y Wisg Sidan (The Silk Dress) (a screen adaptation of Elena Puw Morgan's novel).  Also in 1994, Iwan played the lead role as Barry Pritchard in the drama series A55; the series won a BAFTA Cymru award in 1995 for Best Drama Series.  Iwan Roberts also appeared in various film roles in the early 1990s, including Y Beicar (The Biker) and Gwynfyd (Blessedness).

Iwcs a Doyle: 1996–1999
In 1996, Iwan Roberts diversified his career and together with guitarist John Doyle, formed a duo, calling themselves Iwcs a Doyle. The pair entered the annually held Cân i Gymru (Song for Wales) contest, and won the competition that year. Iwcs a Doyle released an album of songs in 1996 entitled Edrychiad Cynta''' (First Look),<ref>{{cite web|url=https://itunes.apple.com/gb/album/edrychiad-cynta/id199211286|title='iTunes – Edrychiad Cynta|accessdate=29 April 2014}}</ref> which was produced by Les Morisson, and received popular and critical acclaim. The pair performed in many venues and music festivals, including Sesiwn Fawr Dolgellau, Wales, and the Pan Celtic Festival in Tralee, Ireland in 1996.

Television, theatre and film: 1999–2007
Iwan Roberts continued to act during his time with Iwcs a Doyle – perhaps his most notable role being the portrayal of wine merchant Gary Lovell in the popular S4C drama Pengelli (1997–2000).  In 1999 he appeared as the character Hari Bont in Porc Peis Bach (1999–2004), and later acted in the drama series Talcen Caled (2001–2003), a period drama screen adaptation of Marion Eames' novel Y Stafell Ddirgel (The Secret Room) (2002), and had a regular role in the teenage soap opera Xtra (2002–2003). During this period Roberts provided voice over for the restoration of the 1935 Ifan ab Owen Edwards film Y Chwarelwr (The Quarryman), as well as for various Welsh-language animations, and on various radio plays on BBC Radio Cymru.

Around this time Iwan Roberts also appeared in the one-man theatre and film production of the National Eisteddfod of Wales pryddest Awelon, acted the role of Elvis Presley in the two-person theatre show "Plant Gladys" (Gladys' Children), as well as appearing in the play "Bownsars" (a Welsh-language adaptation of John Godber's play 'Bouncers.

At the same time Iwan "Iwcs" Roberts appeared in the BAFTA-winning film Eldra (2003) and played the role of Paul in the Ankst production Y Lleill (The Others), which gained Institute of Contemporary Arts residency in December 2006, and which was also awarded a BAFTA for best film.

Solo musical career: 2005–2007
Roberts composed and recorded his first solo album entitled Cynnal Fflam (Maintaining the Flame) in 2005. The album was recorded in Waunfawr, Gwynedd, was co-produced with Bob Galvin. Throughout his career as a performer and artist he has cited his primary inspiration and influences to be that of the natural living environment and the people around him.

Pobol y Cwm: 2007–2014
Roberts returned to Pobol y Cwm in 2007 to play the role of Kevin Powell. He remained in this role as one of the main characters until 2014. He also guest-appeared on the show from 2015 to 2019.

Radio 
He presented his own radio show on radio cymru in 2019 and 2020.

Selected filmography

References

External links
 Pobol y Cwm information page on Iwan "Iwcs" Roberts' character Kevin Powell

Welsh male stage actors
Welsh male television actors
Welsh-language singers
Welsh male soap opera actors
21st-century Welsh male singers
Welsh singer-songwriters
Welsh-speaking actors
1967 births
Living people
21st-century Welsh male actors
People from Trawsfynydd
British male singer-songwriters